Christopher Lind Peters  has been Dean of Ross, Ireland, since 1998.

Peters was educated at Oak Hill Theological College; and ordained in 1983.   After  curacies in Knockbreda and Lisburn he held incumbencies at Kilmocomogue (1987–1993); Killiney, (1993–1998); and Rosscarbery, (1998–). He was Chancellor of Saint Fin Barre's Cathedral from 1998.

References

1956 births
Alumni of Oak Hill College
Deans of Ross, Ireland
Living people